Railway stations in Jharkhand are under jurisdiction of three railway zones; the Eastern Railway zone, East Central Railway zone & South Eastern Railway Zone.

List
These are the railway stations in the state of Jharkhand in India.

References

 
Railway junction stations in Jharkhand
Jharkhand